Ibom Multi-Specialty Hospital (Ibom Specialist Hospital) is in Uyo, Akwa Ibom State. It is popularly referred to as "ISH".

History 
Ibom Specialist Hospital (ISH) was established by the Senator Godswill Akpabio during his tenure as Akwa Ibom State Governor. In 2015, the hospital was officially launched and operations began 6 months later. The hospital is operated by medical professionals paid by the state government to train and also carry out medical operations. The hospital began operations with 150 expatriates mostly made up of Indians.

On April 18, 2018, the hospital recorded its first neurosurgery.

References 

Buildings and structures in Akwa Ibom State
Hospitals established in 2015